Neocrepidodera transsilvanica is a species of flea beetle from the Chrysomelidae family that can be found in Poland, Romania, Slovakia, and Ukraine.

References

Beetles described in 1864
Beetles of Europe
transsilvanica